The Maxus G10 van is a large luxury MPV or minivan launched on the Chinese car market in April 2014.

Overview
The Maxus G10 is the second car under the Maxus brand following the Maxus V80 van, which is a sub-brand owned by the Shanghai Automotive Industry Corporation (SAIC). It is available in 7, 9, and 10 seat configurations.

In Malaysia, the Maxus G10 was launched in April 2016 with two variants: Luxury and Sport. An SE variant was launched a year later in June 2017. All variants of the Maxus G10 in Malaysia is powered by a 2.0 litre turbocharged direct injection petrol engine capable of producing 225 hp at 5,500 rpm and 345 Nm at 4,000 rpm.

Maxus EG10 electric van
The Maxus EG10 electric van was based on the Maxus G10 van and was launched on the Chinese car market in early 2016 with the benefits of green-car subsidies from the Chinese government. With a range of only 150 kilometers, the electric EG10 is powered by an electric motor with an output of 204hp and 800nm of torque.

Gallery

References

External links

https://www.ldvautomotive.com.au/vehicles/ldv-g10-people-mover/
https://www.ldvautomotive.com.au/vehicles/ldv-g10-executive-people-mover/

G10
Minivans
Production electric cars
Cars introduced in 2014
Rear-wheel-drive vehicles